Daniel O'Regan (born January 30, 1994) is a German-born American professional ice hockey forward for the Grand Rapids Griffins of the American Hockey League (AHL) while under contract to the Detroit Red Wings of the National Hockey League (NHL). O'Regan was drafted in the fifth-round, 138th overall, by the San Jose Sharks in the 2012 NHL Entry Draft. He is the son of former professional ice hockey player Tom O'Regan.

Playing career
O’Regan spent parts of his childhood in Germany, where he started skating. After his father had retired from professional ice hockey, the family returned to the United States, settling in Needham, Massachusetts.

He attended Roxbury Latin School in West Roxbury, Massachusetts, before transferring to St. Sebastian's School in Needham, Massachusetts, after his sophomore year. He attended the USA Hockey's National Team Development Program and subsequently enrolled at Boston University in 2012, leading the Terriers in points as a freshman, while making the Hockey East All-Rookie Team. He received Hockey East Second Team honors as a junior, helping BU win the Hockey East championship and was named to the All-Regional Team (NCAA Tournament). An assistant captain his senior year, he was named a Hockey East First Team All-Star. O’Regan played 154 games wearing a Terriers' uniform, tallying 66 goals and 88 assists to become the first BU player to pass the 150-point mark since 1998.

In April 2016, he signed a two-year entry-level contract with the San Jose Sharks of the National Hockey League (NHL). He was initially assigned to AHL affiliate, the San Jose Barracuda to begin the 2016–17 season. On November 21, 2016, O'Regan was recalled from the Barracuda by the San Jose Sharks to make his NHL debut against the New Jersey Devils. He was scoreless as the Sharks were victorious in a 4–0 shutout effort. O'Regan was soon returned to the Barracuda and continued to lead the club in scoring in his first professional season. In 63 regular season games, O'Regan compiled a league best 58 points as a rookie, helping the Barracuda to their first pacific division title. He added 7 points in 15 post-season games before suffering defeat in the Western Conference finals to the Grand Rapids Griffins. O'Regan was awarded as the AHL's Rookie of the Year and earned a selection to the AHL All-Rookie Team.

During the 2017–18 season, on February 26, 2018, the Sharks traded O'Regan along with a conditional first-round and fourth-round pick in the 2019 NHL Entry Draft to the Buffalo Sabres in exchange for Evander Kane. He was called up by Buffalo for the first time on March 7, 2018, reuniting O'Regan with his two linemates from Boston University, Jack Eichel and Evan Rodrigues.

On July 1, 2019, O'Regan signed a one-year, two-way contract with the New York Rangers. O'Regan was assigned to the Rangers' AHL affiliate, the Hartford Wolf Pack, for the duration of the 2019–20 season, where he placed second on the club in scoring with 38 points through 62 games before the season was cancelled due to the COVID-19 pandemic.

On October 11, 2020, O'Regan signed a one-year, two-way contract with the Vegas Golden Knights. In the pandemic delayed 2020–21 season, O'Regan was assigned by the Golden Knights to join AHL affiliate, the Henderson Silver Knights, for their inaugural season. He led the team in scoring with a point-per-game pace of 16 goals and 21 assists in 37 games.

On July 29, 2021, O'Regan signed a two-year, two-way contract with the Anaheim Ducks. On December 19, 2022, the Ducks traded O'Regan to the Detroit Red Wings in exchange for Michael Del Zotto. Prior to being traded, he recorded three goals and 15 assists in 27 games for the San Diego Gulls during the 2022–23 season.

International play
Representing the United States, O'Regan won gold at the 2012 U18 World Championships and also played at the 2014 U20 World Championships.

Personal
O'Regan was born in Berlin, Germany, where his father Tom, a former Boston University team captain, played professionally for Berliner SC Preussen at the time. His older brother Tommy previously played ice hockey at Harvard University.

Career statistics

Regular season and playoffs

International

Awards and honors

References

External links

1994 births
Living people
AHCA Division I men's ice hockey All-Americans
American men's ice hockey centers
Anaheim Ducks players
Boston University alumni
Boston University Terriers men's ice hockey players
Buffalo Sabres players
Grand Rapids Griffins players
Hartford Wolf Pack players
Henderson Silver Knights players
Ice hockey players from Massachusetts
Rochester Americans players
Roxbury Latin School alumni
San Diego Gulls (AHL) players
San Jose Barracuda players
San Jose Sharks draft picks
San Jose Sharks players
USA Hockey National Team Development Program players